Tilly Decker (born 10 January 1930) is a Luxembourgian sprinter. She competed in the women's 100 metres at the 1948 Summer Olympics.

References

External links
 

1930 births
Possibly living people
Athletes (track and field) at the 1948 Summer Olympics
Luxembourgian female sprinters
Olympic athletes of Luxembourg
Sportspeople from Esch-sur-Alzette
Olympic female sprinters